The 2020 United States House of Representatives election in Delaware was held on November 3, 2020, to elect the U.S. representative from Delaware's at-large congressional district. The election coincided with the 2020 U.S. presidential election, as well as other elections to the House of Representatives, elections to the United States Senate and various state and local elections. The Democratic and Republican primaries was held on September 15, 2020.

Incumbent Democratic Congresswoman Lisa Blunt Rochester ran for re-election to a third term. She was re-elected with 64.5% of the vote in 2018.

Republican nominee Lee Murphy is a private citizen and worked for most of his life at Amtrak as a conductor and manager.  Murphy has also worked as an actor and has appeared in Netflix's House of Cards.

Democratic primary

Candidates

Nominee
Lisa Blunt Rochester, incumbent U.S. Representative

Declined
Scott Walker, Republican nominee for Delaware's at-large congressional district in 2018 (ran for Governor as a Republican)

Endorsements

Republican primary

Candidates

Nominee
Lee Murphy, actor and candidate for Delaware's at-large congressional district in 2018

Eliminated in primary
Matthew Morris, sales consultant

Results

Libertarian primary

Candidates

Nominee
David L. Rogers

Independent Party of Delaware

Declared 
Catherine S. Purcell, college student and pro-Trump activist

General election

Predictions

Endorsements

Polling

Results

Notes

References

External links
 
 
  (State affiliate of the U.S. League of Women Voters)
 

Official campaign websites
 Lisa Blunt Rochester (D) for Congress
 Lee Murphy (R) for Congress

Delaware
2020
House